Newport Pagnell Services is a motorway service station between junctions 14 and 15 of the M1 motorway near Newport Pagnell in the City of Milton Keynes, north Buckinghamshire, England. It is owned and operated by Welcome Break.

History
Newport Pagnell Services was one of the first service stations to be opened in the UK, opening the same day as Watford Gap services on 2 November 1959. Newport Pagnell was the first to fully open for all traffic, opening on 15th August 1960, a month before Watford Gap. Like the motorway, the site was designed by Sir Owen Williams. The services were opened by Forte, and were taken over by Welcome Break in 1988.

The service station is one of fourteen for which large murals were commissioned from artist David Fisher in the 1990s, designed to reflect the local area and history.

In the news
On 3 September 2007, a National Express coach from Birmingham to Luton Airport and Stansted Airport (making an unscheduled stop) failed to make a turn on the approach road and overturned.  A number of people including the driver were seriously injured.  The driver was subsequently convicted of drink driving and dangerous driving.

References

External links
Official Web Page
Motorway Services Online - Newport Pagnell
Motorway Services Trivia Website - Newport Pagnell

1959 establishments in the United Kingdom
Buildings and structures in Milton Keynes
M1 motorway service stations
Transport infrastructure completed in 1959
Welcome Break motorway service stations